Edward Broadbent could refer to:

Ed Broadbent (born 1936), Canadian politician
Edward Broadbent (British Army officer) (1875–1944), British Army officer

See also
Edmund Hamer Broadbent (1861–1945), English Christian missionary